Il était une fois... la vie, also known as , is a French animated series which tells the story of the human body for children, in a simplified and educational way. The program was originally produced in France in 1987 by Procidis and directed by Albert Barillé. The series consists of 26 episodes and originally was aired on the French channel Canal+, and then on the state-owned channel FR3. It is the third part of the Once Upon a Time... series.

Once Upon a Time... Life brought back the edutainment formula that had largely been left out on Once Upon a Time... Space. The series combined entertaining storylines with factual information, presented metaphorically.

Overview
The series Once Upon a Time... Life used the same recurring lead characters as the other Once Upon a Time... series: certain represent the cells that make up the body's systems and defense mechanisms, such as red blood cells, white blood cells and platelets, while antagonists represent viruses and bacteria that threaten to attack the human body. Every episode of the series featured a different organ or system within the human body (like the brain, the heart, the circulatory system, etc.).

In the French-language version of the series, the opening theme song "L'hymne à la vie" (French for "hymn for life") by Michel Legrand was performed by Sandra Kim, winner of the 1986 Eurovision Song Contest. In the English-language dub, the song was translated into English and retitled "This life is life that's life", sung to the same tune as the French. 

The series was aired in the Arab states of the Persian Gulf, Armenia, Australia, Austria, Belgium, Brazil, Canada, Chile, Croatia, Czechoslovakia, Denmark, Finland, France, Gabon, Germany, Greece, Haiti, Hungary, Iceland, Ireland, Israel, Italy, Japan, Kenya, Mexico, Morocco, the Netherlands, Norway, Poland, Portugal, the Soviet Union, Senegal, Singapore, Slovakia, Slovenia, South Africa, South Korea, Spain, Sweden, Switzerland, Syria, Taiwan, Thailand, Turkey, the United Kingdom, Venezuela, Yugoslavia and Zimbabwe.

Characters
The series makes use of recurring human characters originally from both Once Upon a Time... Man and Once Upon a Time... Space. Every character in the series appeared as a real person (the old intelligent doctor, the dedicated blonde mother, the boy and the girl, their obese friend, and the pair of bullies) and anthropomorphic representations of cells and cellular functions within the human body. 
 The manager of the brain – represented by Maestro, the bearded old man. 
 The manager of the cell nucleus – represented by Maestro, usually asleep in his chair. 
 Enzymes – The human body's workmen, shown usually as a man in a bib overall and a baseball-type cap. 
 Digestive enzymes - Works of digestion. Some enzymes are shown as female and most as male. The females are only seen in the stomach. The males appear in the stomach and small intestine. 
 Hormones – messengers for the body, represented as humanoid robotic outboard motors spray-painted according to function; those representing thyroxine are given life by iodine. These hormones are all female. 
 Red blood cells – represented by red humanoids: elderly Professor Globus, who tells a lot about how the body works; Hemo; and his inquisitive and mischievous friend Globin. They carry oxygen bubbles or carbon dioxide bubbles in a back pouch, becoming dark red when carrying carbon dioxide. 
Neurotransmitters-The blue speedy guys that can deliver messages as papers or passengers through nerves and stations. They are mostly running anytime on delivery, and pick up or drop off passenger times until they reach the end. 
 Platelets – represented as red disks with a face, legs and arms. 
 White blood cells – The body's police force. 
 Neutrophil granulocytes – represented by foot-patrol "policemen" which are completely white in color, and wear a yellow star badge. They carry batons and swallow any bacterias that they find. They can clone themselves. Most of the time they function as traffic cops. Their commander is the same but with a Caucasian head, and is named Jumbo or Jumbo Junior.
 Lymphocytes – represented by:
 Lymphocytes B – as marshals in a small one-man round flying craft with two aimable side-mounted hydrojet propulsors; two of them are a version of Peter and Psi (named Captain Peter and Lieutenant Claire). Some other (unnamed) B cell pilot characters each appear more than once, for example a spotty-faced teenage boy. They can drop antibodies from an underbelly bomb bay. They can multiplicate themselves through mitosis duplicating the craft and the pilot. Their uniforms are very light blue with shoulder pads. (Those uniforms appear in the outside world in a few futuristic scenes as astronaut uniforms/undersuits.)
 Lymphocytes T – the same sort of craft but with a large uppercase T on the underbelly at the bow. They can discharge a purple smoke that kills bacteria and cancer cells. 
 Phagocyte – hovering spherical craft with several large suction tubes coming out of them. A pilot's head can be seen through a small canopy on top. They can engulf bacteria. 
 Basophils – plump women who carry a basket of "histamine grenades" and throw them to attack toxins. 
 Macrophages – (a big yellow ground vehicles shaped like frog heads with a big front scoop grab and three wheels; each "eye" is a small canopy revealing a pilot's head), "the cleaning services of the body". Most of the time they function by removing the body' waste and during emergency times they phagocyte bacteria and viruses. 
Immature leucocytes: teenage humanoids with the same uniform as the lymphocyte B pilots: seen in the thymus, which is represented as a police training college. 
 The antibodies – a small white insectoid characters which after being launched at infectious agents, fly around the bacteria or viruses and paralyze them. Their commander is named Metro. 
The Pathogens are the main antagonists of the series. They are the characters that make people sick. The other antagonists are the Immature leukocytes in Bone Marrow,
 The bacteria (represented as blue bullies) – the big bully. Mostly blue in color. 
 The viruses (represented as yellow worms with hands) – the smaller bully. Mostly yellow in color. 
 Organic molecules, which are represented in two cases as characters. 
Fats/Fatty acids: Represented as fat yellow ponies.
Proteins : Represented as a tall, strong, and muscular orange character in overalls with some doglike features.
Sugars : Small green-and-purple hexagons and pentagons. Sometimes appear as candylike characters. 
Amino acids : Similar appearance to antibodies, generally invisible until the episode dealing with protein synthesis.
DNA/RNA : Represented quite accurately and in detail when explaining protein synthesis.
Vitamins : Represented as colored living letters. As seen in the lymphatic system, P is present but rarely. 
Cholesterol : Yellow seal-like characters that can block a passage of a blood vessel. As seen in "The liver factory", the cholesterol accumulated around Jumbo, blocking the passage of the red blood cells in the blood vessel.
Gall/Bile : Blue-green-colored liquid that makes the fats shrink, as seen in "The digestion". 
The series describes a "society inside the body" with a strong pyramidal stratification of work.

Episodes

Regional home-video releases
In some English-language versions, the title is rendered as "Once Upon a Time – Life" in the opening credits.

A partwork version called How My Body Works was produced for the United Kingdom in 50 hardback volumes, each with about 30 A4-sized pages, described as "an Orbis play & learn collection". In it, some of the characters have different names: The Professor for the Maestro; Captain Courageous and Ace for the lymphocyte B crafts' pilots; Plasmus and Globina for Hemo and Globin, Corpo for Jumbo; Toxicus, Germus and Infectius for the bacterium characters; Virulus for the virus character. VHS copies of the English-language television episodes were included with issues.

A DVD box set of all the episodes of the series was produced by Procidis, and distributed locally by various distributors. The DVD series was produced in French, English, Polish, Finnish, German, Italian, Hebrew, Norwegian, Hungarian, Dutch and Swedish, but was not released in the United Kingdom. In 2011, the DVD box set was available in English in Canada, distributed by Imavision.

Biological accuracy

Most biological terminology is translated with care, but a few mistakes were made and there are some anachronisms.

 The heart chamber now known as the atrium is called the "auricle" in episode 7, a term correct at the time of production, but which is now used for another structure in the heart. 
 In episode 4, "Pulmonary aorta" is used for "pulmonary artery", which is a mistake because unlike fish, humans do not have two aortae.
 More inaccuracies include complete lack of antigen presenting cell activity (by Macrophages, B-cells and Dendritic cells) in order to trigger the adaptive immune system according to MHCII complex. Though it is mentioned that Antibodies need to be specific to the disease's pathogen, the way that specificity is obtained is not shown.  Also, some aspects of the immune system are not portrayed, like natural killer cells and the complement system.
 In episode 11, it is explained that lysosomes are found in tears to protect and clean the eye surface, but the correct term are the lysozymes. 
 In episode 13, when professor Globus presents the receptors of the skin, the Meissner's corpuscle is mentioned as Golgi corpuscle, a cell organelle responsible for protein transportation.

See also
 List of French animated television series
 List of French television series
 Osmosis Jones, a 2001 American film with a similar premise
 Cells at Work!, a 2015 manga series with a similar premise
 Fantastic Voyage
 Innerspace

References

External links
Official website - series producer

 Hello Maestro at YouTube

Once Upon a Time...
1987 French television series debuts
1988 French television series endings
1980s French animated television series
French children's animated education television series
Health education television series
Human body
Eiken (studio)